The Southern Movement ( al-Ḥirāk al-Janūbiyy), sometimes known as the Southern Separatist Movement, or South Yemen Movement, or Aden Movement, and colloquially known as al-Hirak, is a political movement and paramilitary organization active in the south of Yemen since 2007, demanding secession from the Republic of Yemen and a return to the former independent state of South Yemen. At present, its best-known political offshoot, the Southern Transitional Council led by Aidarus al-Zoubaidi, is the de facto leadership across many provinces of the south.

History

1994 Yemen Civil War

After the union between South Yemen and North Yemen on May 22, 1990, a civil war broke out in 1994. This came after leaders of the former independent southern state declared an end to the unity deal amidst an alleged power-grabbing usurp by their northern counterparts. The result was a swift defeat of the weakened southern forces and the expulsion of most of its leaders out of Yemen, including the former Secretary-General of the Yemeni Socialist Party and the Vice-President of unified Yemen, Ali Salim al-Beidh.

After 1994
After the 1994 civil war, calls for southern independence were successfully put down and national unity was maintained. Grievances however remained high amongst many residents of the south. Accusations of corruption, nepotism, and electoral fraud were leveled against the new ruling party based in Sana'a, led by President Ali Abdullah Saleh, as well as a mishandling of the power-sharing arrangement agreed to by both parties in the 1990 unity deal.

Many in the south also felt that their land, home to much of the country's oil reserves and wealth resources, was being exploited after the unity deal. Privately owned land was seized and distributed amongst people affiliated with the Sana'a government. Several hundred thousand militaries and civil employees from the south were forced into early retirement and compensated with pensions below the subsistence level. Although equally, low living standards were prevalent throughout the whole of Yemen, many in the south felt that they were being intentionally targeted and dismissed from important posts, and being replaced with northern officials affiliated with the new government. The city of Aden, the former capital city of South Yemen, also witnessed neglect both socially and economically, whilst new investments appeared to be focussed instead on northern Sana'a, the new capital.

Beyond the economic grievances were also cultural and social ones too. Many in the south long believed their history was distinct from that of their northern neighbours. This became more evident after the 1990 unity. After 128 years of British rule, South Yemen was an independent state for 23 years. Despite the economic difficulty in its later years with the collapse of its main backer the Soviet Union, the socialist state prided itself on its free healthcare, education and welfare system. Many in Aden today speak foreign languages or have technical skills as a result of their state-sponsored education abroad enjoyed in the days of pre-unity South Yemen. Unlike the north, tribalism was looked upon with disdain and generally stamped out of everyday life in the south, which instead preferred the law and order of civil society passed onto them from British rule. Post-1994 unity saw a gradual return of tribalism into southern society. It is not uncommon for residents of the south to even refer to those from the north as being "mutikhalifeen" or backward.

In May 2007, grieving pensioners who had not been paid for years began to organise small demonstrations demanding better rights and an end to the economic and political marginalization of the south. As the protests spread throughout Aden and grew more popular, so too did the demands of those protesting. Eventually, calls were being made once again for the secession of the south and the re-establishment of South Yemen as an independent state. The government's response to these peaceful protests was heavy-handed, labeling them as 'apostates of the state' and using live ammunition to disperse the crowds.

This eventually gave birth to the Southern Movement, which grew to consist of a loose coalition of groups seeking a complete secession from the north. Their presence in the south was restricted, and their actions were limited to the organising of protests and marches across the south which were often met with deadly violence. To raise the former flag of South Yemen was considered a crime in Aden, although a common practice outside of the city where government control was limited.

Multiple protests by the Southern Movement took place between 2007-09, during which 100 were killed.

Yemen Civil War

In 2015, the Southern Movement rose to prominence after entering into a loose alliance with the exiled President Hadi and proving to be a vital force in the pushback against Houthi forces from the southern city of Aden, receiving both financial and military assistance from members of the  Gulf coalition as a result.

Today, the Southern Movement through its political branch the Southern Transitional Council has a significant presence in all areas of the former southern territories. Flags of the former southern republic are flown from Aden to Hadramout, often alongside those of the Arab coalition as a gesture of gratitude for their ongoing support.

In January 2018, schisms became evident between the STC and Hadi government after clashes in the city of Aden following the dismissal of STC leader Aidarus al-Zoubaidi by the Hadi leadership.

2019 Aden Takeover 

On 1 August 2019, the Houthi movement based in Sana’a launched an attack on a southern military ceremony in the city of Aden. A medium-range ballistic missile was used to kill dozens in the camp, including a well-known and senior commander of the southern movement known as Muneer al-Yafee or Abu al-Yamama. 

The attack triggered widespread anger in the south, with the Southern Transitional Council leveling blame at the Hadi-affiliated Islamist Islah party, accusing them of complicity in the attack. In response, a four-day battle took place between UAE-backed forces belonging to the southern movement and those loyal to the Saudi-backed Hadi government. This was the first major time a rift had been so visible between both partners of the Saudi coalition that had previously been united, at least ostensibly, in their opposition to the Houthi movement.

Dozens were killed in the infighting, which came to an end with the southern forces taking control of all government buildings and military camps within the city including the symbolic presidential palace. 

In response, Saudi Arabia launched an air strike in the city as a warning to the southern forces.

On 26 April 2020, after reaching a peace deal in November 2019, the  Southern Transitional Council (STC) broke the terms of agreement and said that it would rule Aden and other southern regions. However, the move infuriated Saudi-backed Yemeni government, who warned of "dangerous and catastrophic consequences".

Military offensive

See also
 Southern Transitional Council
 Security Belt
 Shabwani Elite

References

External links
 The Southern Movement in Yemen, Gulf Research Center, April 2010
 Yemen's Southern Challenge, Critical Threats (American Enterprise Institute), November 2009
 Website

2007 establishments in Yemen
Arab militant groups
Arab separatism
Independence movements
Organizations established in 2007
Organizations of the Arab Spring
Organizations of the Yemeni Crisis (2011–present)
Rebel groups in Yemen
Rebel groups that actively control territory
Separatism in Yemen
Secessionist organizations
Yemeni Revolution